David Fink is an Israeli Orthodox rabbi and expert in halacha and Jewish medical ethics.

Biography
Fink lived in the United States before making aliyah to Israel. Fink received his Rabbinic ordination from Yeshivas Itri and the Mir yeshiva in Jerusalem, and was awarded his Ph.D in Semitic languages and Linguistics from Yale University. Fink has been actively teaching for more than two decades and is a well-known and an authoritative posek in Jerusalem.

Yeshiva faculty

Fink has been part of the faculty or taught at the following yeshivot in the United States and Israel:
Yeshiva University (YU Torah)
Yeshivat Simchat Shelomo
Yeshivat Hamivtar
Aish HaTorah
Mayanot Institute of Jewish Studies
Webyeshiva
Midreshet Lindenbaum
Sulam Yaakov Rabbinical Institute

Publications
Fink is a member of the editorial board of the Journal of Medical Ethics and Halacha published by the Dr. Falk Schlesinger Institute for Medical-Halachic Research at Shaare Zedek Medical Center, Jerusalem.

 Arba`ah Turim of Rabbi Jacob ben Asher on Medical Ethics, "Journal of Medical Ethics and Halacha''

References

External links

 

 
 

American emigrants to Israel
American Orthodox rabbis
Israeli Orthodox rabbis
Yale Graduate School of Arts and Sciences alumni
Living people
Year of birth missing (living people)
21st-century American Jews